Ripple was an American funk band from Michigan. The group was signed to GRC Records and Salsoul Records in the 1970s, and scored several hit singles, the biggest of which were "I Don't Know What It Is, but It Sure Is Funky" and "The Beat Goes On and On," the latter on Salsoul Records, joined by the Salsoul Orchestra. After moving to Atlanta, Georgia, Wally, Kenny, and Brian restructured the group, adding Victor Burks (keyboards) and Barry Lee (guitar). The group toured extensively around the Southeast, the highlight of which was opening for George Clinton and Parliament Funkadelic on their "Mothership Connection" tour.  Wally, Kenny, Brian, Victor, and Barry went on to record their seminal album, Sons of the Gods. "The Beat Goes On and On", from that album, became a disco/hustle classic that still receives airplay today.

The signature "oh-la oh-la ay" line from "I Don't Know What It Is, but It Sure Is Funky" was later incorporated into Marcia Griffiths' smash hit, "Electric Boogie (Electric Slide)," along with Kid 'n Play's 1988 hit "Rollin' with Kid 'n Play."

Band members
Keith Samuels - guitar, lead vocals
Simon Kenneth Carter - bass, vocals
Brian Sherrer - drums, percussion, timbales
Walter (Wally) Carter - conga, percussion, vocals
Dave Ferguson - trumpet, flugel horn, percussion
William (Bill) Hull - tenor sax, flute, percussion
Curtis Reynolds - organ, piano, vibe master, vibraphone, vocals
Victor Burks - keyboards, vocals
Barry Lee - guitar

Discography

Albums
Ripple (GRC Records, 1973)
Sons of the Gods (Salsoul Records, 1977)

Singles

References

External links
 

Musical groups from Michigan
American funk musical groups
Salsoul Records artists
1973 establishments in Michigan